In geometry, the folium of Descartes (named for René Descartes) is an algebraic curve defined by the implicit equation

History 
The curve was first proposed and studied by René Descartes in 1638. Its claim to fame lies in an incident in the development of calculus. Descartes challenged Pierre de Fermat to find the tangent line to the curve at an arbitrary point since Fermat had recently discovered a method for finding tangent lines. Fermat solved the problem easily, something Descartes was unable to do. Since the invention of calculus, the slope of the tangent line can be found easily using implicit differentiation.

Graphing the curve 

The folium of Descartes can be expressed in polar coordinates as 

which is plotted on the left. This is equivalent to

This yields the rational parametric equations:

.

We can see that the parameter is related to the position on the curve as follows:

The symmetry can be seen directly from its equation (x and y can be interchanged). By applying rotation of 45° CW for example, one can plot the function symmetric over rotated x axis.

This operation is equivalent to a substitution:

and yields

Plotting in the Cartesian system of  gives the folium rotated by 45° and therefore symmetric by -axis.

Properties 
It forms a loop in the first quadrant with a double point at the origin and asymptote

It is symmetrical about the line . As such, the two intersect at the origin and at the point .

Implicit differentiation gives the formula for the slope of the tangent line to this curve to beUsing either one of the polar representations above, the area of the interior of the loop is found to be . Moreover, the area between the "wings" of the curve and its slanted asymptote is also .

Relationship to the trisectrix of Maclaurin 

The folium of Descartes is related to the trisectrix of Maclaurin by affine transformation. To see this, start with the equation 

and change variables to find the equation in a coordinate system rotated 45 degrees. This amounts to setting  

In the  plane the equation is 

If we stretch the curve in the  direction by a factor of  this becomes 

which is the equation of the trisectrix of Maclaurin.

Notes

References 
 J. Dennis Lawrence: A catalog of special plane curves, 1972, Dover Publications. , pp. 106–108
 George F. Simmons: Calculus Gems: Brief Lives and Memorable Mathematics, New York 1992, McGraw-Hill, xiv,355. ; new edition 2007, The Mathematical Association of America (MAA)

External links 

"Folium of Descartes" at MacTutor's Famous Curves Index
"Cartesian Folium" at MathCurve

Plane curves
Algebraic curves
René Descartes